Henry Francis Crisfield (13 September 1877 – 2 February 1945) was an Australian rules footballer who played with Carlton in the Victorian Football League (VFL).

Notes

External links 
		
Henry Crisfield's profile at Blueseum

1877 births
1945 deaths
Australian rules footballers from Victoria (Australia)
Carlton Football Club players
Australian military personnel of World War I